Graham Lunsford "Doc" Mathis (July 11, 1909 – October 24, 1986) was an American football, basketball, and baseball coach and college athletics administrator.  He was the head football coach at East Carolina Teachers College—now known as East Carolina University—from 1934 to 1935, compiling a record of 4–7–1.  Mathis was also the head basketball coach at East Carolina from 1934 to 1936, Catawba College from 1936 to 1937, and Elon University from 1949 to 1959, amassing a career college basketball coaching record of 184–150.  Mathis was also the head baseball coach at Elon from 1954 to 1956, tallying a mark of 46–19, and the school's athletic director in 1956.

Head coaching record

Football

References

1909 births
1986 deaths
American football guards
American men's basketball players
Baseball outfielders
Basketball coaches from North Carolina
Basketball players from North Carolina
Forwards (basketball)
Catawba Indians men's basketball coaches
Chicago Cubs scouts
Davidson Wildcats baseball players
Davidson Wildcats football players
Davidson Wildcats men's basketball players
East Carolina Pirates football coaches
East Carolina Pirates men's basketball coaches
Elon Phoenix athletic directors
Elon Phoenix baseball coaches
Elon Phoenix men's basketball coaches
People from Wilkes County, North Carolina